Flying Free is the fourth studio album by Native American band Black Eagle, released on March 9, 2004 and recorded in July 2002. It received the Grammy Award for Best Native American Music Album in 2004.

Track listing 
"Flying Free" (Yepa) – 3:37
"Dancing Colors" (Yepa) – 5:14
"The Beautiful Dance" (Yepa) – 5:39
"Flight of the Eagle" (Tosa) – 3:43
"Running Strong (Jam On!)" (Romero) – 4:38
"Prepare Yourself to Dance" (Yepa) – 6:05
"Get Up Dance With a Good Heart" (Yepa) – 7:05
"Beautiful Jingle Dancer" (Yepa) – 3:36
"(Singing in the Circle)" (Yepa) – 3:55
"Katesi Tekakwitha" (Yepa) – 5:39
"The Eagle" (Yepa) – 3:01
"From the Heart" (Yepa) – 4:51

Personnel

Antonio Blue Eyes – performer
Tom Bee – sound mixing, producer
Kendrick Casiquito – performer
Francois Charron – graphic designer
Isaiah "Roswell" Chinana – performer
Cheryl Chinznz – performer
Douglas Geist – engineer
J. Douglas Geist – engineer
Eric Larson – mastering
Shawn Romero – composer
David Yepa, Jr. – composer
Malcom Yepa – composer

References

2004 albums
Albums produced by Tom Bee
Grammy Award for Best Native American Music Album